Gimme the Loot may refer to:

 Gimme the Loot (film), a 2012 American comedy film
 "Gimme the Loot", song by The Notorious B.I.G. from Ready to Die
 "Gimme the Loot" (song), song by Russian rapper Big Baby Tape